Teoc Creek is a stream in the U.S. state of Mississippi.

Teoc is a name derived from the Choctaw language meaning "pine". Variant names are "Long Pine Creek" and "North Teoctalia Creek".

References

Rivers of Mississippi
Rivers of Carroll County, Mississippi
Mississippi placenames of Native American origin